The Christians and the Pagans is an EP by Dar Williams released as a holiday bonus by Razor and Tie. It is also the name of a song by the same artist from the subsequent album Mortal City.

Track listing
 "The Christians and the Pagans"
 "Traveling Again" (Solo)
 "Nora"

External links
 (for Dar Williams discography)

Dar Williams albums
1996 EPs
Christianity in music
Paganism in music